Thomas E. Stagg Jr. (January 19, 1923 – June 23, 2015) was a United States district judge of the United States District Court for the Western District of Louisiana.

Education and career

Born on January 19, 1923, in Shreveport, Louisiana, Stagg received a Bachelor of Arts degree in 1943 from Louisiana State University and a Bachelor of Laws in 1949 from the Paul M. Hebert Law Center at Louisiana State University. He was a United States Army infantry Captain from 1943 to 1946. He entered private practice in Shreveport from 1949 to 1974. He was Vice-President of King Hardware Company in Louisiana from 1955 to 1974. He was President of the Abe Meyer Corporation in Shreveport from 1960 to 1974. He was managing partner of the Pierremont Mall Shopping Center from 1963 to 1974. He was President of Stagg Investments, Inc. from 1964 to 1974. He was managing partner of the Camellia Trading Company starting in 1974.

Federal judicial service

Stagg was nominated by President Richard Nixon on February 18, 1974, to a seat on the United States District Court for the Western District of Louisiana vacated by Judge Benjamin C. Dawkins Jr. He was confirmed by the United States Senate on March 7, 1974, and received his commission on March 8, 1974. He served as Chief Judge from 1984 to 1991. He assumed senior status on February 29, 1992. His service terminated on June 23, 2015, due to his death in Shreveport.

References

1923 births
2015 deaths
People from Shreveport, Louisiana
United States district court judges appointed by Richard Nixon
Judges of the United States District Court for the Western District of Louisiana
Louisiana lawyers
United States Army personnel of World War II
Louisiana State University alumni
Louisiana State University Law Center alumni